Tryfonas Kroustalelis (born 6 March 1990) is a Greek footballer. He played for Apollon Smyrnis in the Greek Football League, as defender .

References
Myplayer

1990 births
Apollon Smyrnis F.C. players
Greek footballers
Living people
Association football defenders